The Melbourne Outdoor (also called the Victorian Open) was a short-lived men's tennis tournament played in Melbourne, Australia that was re-established from an earlier tournament, held three times from 1983 to 1985. It was part of the Grand Prix tennis circuit and was held on outdoor grass courts.

Men's singles

Doubles

References

Defunct tennis tournaments in Australia
Sports competitions in Melbourne
Grass court tennis tournaments
Grand Prix tennis circuit
1983 establishments in Australia
1985 disestablishments in Australia